Abby Lea Finkenauer (born December 27, 1988) is an American politician who served as the U.S. representative from Iowa's 1st congressional district from 2019 to 2021. She is a member of the Democratic Party.

Before being elected to Congress, Finkenauer served in the Iowa House of Representatives for the 99th district from 2015 to 2019. On November 6, 2018, Finkenauer and fellow Democrat Cindy Axne became the first women from Iowa elected to the U.S. House of Representatives. Finkenauer also became the second-youngest woman to ever be elected to the U.S. House. She lost reelection in 2020 and lost a primary election for the United States Senate in 2022.

Biden Administration 
On December 1, 2022, Finkenauer was appointed United States Special Envoy for Global Youth Issues.

Early life and education
Finkenauer grew up in Sherrill, Iowa. Her father is a welder and her mother works at a public school.

She graduated from Hempstead High School in Dubuque. In 2011, Finkenauer graduated from Drake University in Des Moines, Iowa, with a bachelor's degree in public relations.

Career 
In 2006, Finkenauer was a page for U.S. Representative Jim Nussle, a Republican who represented Northeast Iowa in Congress. The following year, after Nussle ran unsuccessfully for Governor of Iowa, Finkenauer was a page for Patrick Murphy, the Democratic Speaker of the Iowa State House of Representatives.

In 2007, Finkenauer was the Iowa volunteer coordinator for the Joe Biden presidential campaign. She was later legislative aide for Democratic state Representative Todd Taylor and communications specialist for the Community Foundation of Greater Dubuque.

Iowa House of Representatives 
Murphy gave up his seat in 2014 to make an unsuccessful run for Congress, and Finkenauer ran for Murphy's old seat and won. In the Democratic primary, Finkenauer defeated defense attorney Steve Drahozal, receiving 57.8% of the vote. In the general election, she faced lawyer Daniel Dlouhy and defeated him, receiving 60.8% of the vote. She was 25 when first elected to the Iowa House of Representatives.

She was unopposed for reelection in 2016.

U.S. House of Representatives

Elections

2018

In May 2017, Finkenauer announced her candidacy for Iowa's 1st congressional district, which was held by Republican and Dubuque resident Rod Blum. Blum had unexpectedly defeated her former boss, Murphy, in 2014.

On June 5, 2018, she won the Democratic primary, defeating former congressional staffer Thomas Heckroth, engineer Courtney Rowe and retired military officer George Ramsey. She received 66.9% of the vote.

As of September 2018, her race was classified as Lean Democratic or Tilt Democratic by 3 major rating firms. On October 1, 2018, former President Barack Obama endorsed Finkenauer. She defeated Blum with 50.9% of the vote, a margin of 5%.

2020

In 2020, Finkenauer ran again without any Democratic primary opposition. She was defeated in the general election by Republican state Representatives Ashley Hinson, 51.3% to 48.7%.

Tenure 
Finkenauer and Cindy Axne, elected in 2018 to represent Iowa's 3rd congressional district, became the first women to represent Iowa in the U.S. House. She is the second youngest woman ever elected to the House, being about ten months older than fellow 2018 freshman Alexandria Ocasio-Cortez; Finkenauer turned 30 a week before being sworn in on January 3, 2019. Finkenauer also served in House Leadership as an assistant whip during the 116th United States Congress.

Committee assignments 
 Committee on Small Business
 Subcommittee on Innovation and Workforce Development
 Subcommittee on Rural Development, Agriculture, Trade, and Entrepreneurship (Chair)
 Committee on Transportation and Infrastructure
 Subcommittee on Highways and Transit (Vice Chair)
 Subcommittee on Water Resources and Environment

Caucus memberships 
 Congressional Caucus for Women's Issues
 Congressional LGBT Equality Caucus
 Future Forum Caucus (Vice Chair)
 Congressional Endometriosis Caucus (Co-Chair)

2022 U.S. Senate campaign 
On July 22, 2021, Finkenauer announced her candidacy in the Democratic primary for the 2022 U.S. Senate election in Iowa, for the seat held by Chuck Grassley. On April 11, 2022, a judge ruled that she was ineligible for the Democratic primary because her nominating petitions did not have enough verified signatures. Finkenauer said she would appeal the ruling, and four days later on April 15, the Iowa Supreme Court unanimously reversed the decision and allowed Finkenauer to appear on the primary ballot.

Michael Franken, a retired vice admiral in the United States Navy, defeated Finkenauer in the primary election. The Des Moines Register called Franken's victory an upset, as Finkenauer had been the perceived front-runner.

Electoral history

2014

2018

2020

Personal life 
Finkenauer married Daniel Wasta, the Iowa Political Director for the Elizabeth Warren 2020 presidential campaign, on August 8, 2020.

Finkenauer has discussed her experiences with endometriosis and has worked to pass an amendment that would double endometriosis research funding. She is the founder of the Congressional Endometriosis Caucus.

Finkenauer is Roman Catholic.

See also
Women in the United States House of Representatives

References

External links

 
 Member profile at the Iowa General Assembly

|-

|-

1988 births
21st-century American politicians
21st-century American women politicians
21st-century Roman Catholics
Catholic politicians from Iowa
Candidates in the 2022 United States Senate elections
Catholics from Iowa
Democratic Party members of the United States House of Representatives from Iowa
Drake University alumni
Female members of the United States House of Representatives
Living people
Democratic Party members of the Iowa House of Representatives
Politicians from Dubuque, Iowa
Women state legislators in Iowa
People with Endometriosis